Chabar (also Romanized as Chābār; also known as Chāh Bahār and Chāhwār) is a village in Esfandan Rural District, in the Central District of Komijan County, Markazi Province, Iran. At the 2006 census, its population was 141, in 44 families.

References 

Populated places in Komijan County